Pseudoscada erruca is a South-American species of brush-footed butterfly in the Godyridina subtribe of Ithomiini. It was described in 1855 by William Chapman Hewitson as Ithomia erruca.

Distribution and habitat
The type locality of Pseudoscada erruca is Rio Grande do Sul in Brazil. It also occurs in other parts of Brazil, such as Pernambuco, and in Argentina. 

Pseudoscada erruca occurs in humid habitats with a permanent presence of water. Research in 2009 on the frequency of occurrence of species in tribe Ithomiini in old-growth tropical forest versus nearby fragmented landscapes found that the presence of P. erruca was more frequent in the latter than the former.

Behaviour
Females deposit individual eggs on the underside of leaves of Sessea brasiliensis and less commonly Cestrum spp., with a preference for plants at a height between 1 and 1.5 m in shaded spots. Larvae feed from the leaves of the plant on which they hatch, generally developing better on S. brasiliensis than on Cestrum species. Adults drink nectar, with a preference for the flowers of Rubus rosaefolius. Adults of P. erruca are on wing in both dry and rainy seasons.

Parasitoids
Pseudoscapa erruca is host to multiple species of parasitoid wasps, with at least one species each from genera Telenomus, Trichogramma, Diadegma and Mesochorus. It has also been found parasitized by a tachinid fly species.

Footnotes and references

Footnotes

References

Ithomiini
Butterflies described in 1855
Nymphalidae of South America
Taxa named by William Chapman Hewitson